The mixed doubles tournament at the 1985 French Open was held from 27 May until 9 June 1985 on the outdoor clay courts at the Stade Roland Garros in Paris, France. Heinz Günthardt and Martina Navratilova won the title, defeating Paula Smith and Francisco González in the final.

Seeds
 Heinz Günthardt /  Martina Navratilova (champions)
 Ken Flach /  Pam Shriver (second round)
 Wojciech Fibak /  Carling Bassett (second round)
 Vincent Van Patten /  Zina Garrison (third round)
 Mike Bauer /  Catherine Tanvier (semifinals)
 Laurie Warder /  Anne Minter (quarterfinals)
 Tony Giammalva /  Anne Smith (third round)
 Chris Dunk /  Barbara Jordan (second round)

Draw

Finals

Top half

Section 1

Section 2

Bottom half

Section 3

Section 4

External links
1985 French Open – Doubles draws and results at the International Tennis Federation

Mixed Doubles
French Open by year – Mixed doubles